João Alves Jobin Saldanha (3 July 1917 – 12 July 1990) was a Brazilian journalist and football manager. He coached the Brazil national football team during the South American Qualifying to the 1970 FIFA World Cup. Nicknamed João Sem Medo (Fearless João) by Nelson Rodrigues, Saldanha played for Botafogo. He then started a career in journalism and became one of Brazil's most prolific sports columnists. He often criticised players, managers and teams, and was a member of then-illegal Brazilian Communist Party (Partido Comunista Brasileiro – PCB).

Biography and career

In 1957, Botafogo appointed him as their coach, despite his lack of managerial experience. The club won the Rio state championship that season, but Saldanha resigned from the club in 1959. In 1969, he was invited to take charge of the national team, and led them to a perfect 6-0 record. It is alleged that football federation president João Havelange appointed him in the hope that journalists would be less critical of the national team if one of their own was in charge.

Saldanha was publicly criticised by Dorival Yustrich, coach of Flamengo. Saldanha responded by confronting him while brandishing a revolver. Saldanha was said to have fallen out of favour because of his unwillingness to select players who were personal favourites of President Emílio Garrastazu Médici, in particular striker Dario (Brazil was then a military dictatorship). It is reported that Saldanha, after being told that President Médici would be pleased to see Dario in the team, answered, "well, I also have some suggestions to give in the President's ministry choices". The last straw came when the assistant manager resigned, saying that Saldanha was impossible to work with.

Afterwards, Saldanha went back to his journalistic career, even covering the 1970 and 1974 World Cups for TV Globo
and the 1986 and 1990 World Cups for TV Manchete. The day after commenting on the second round match between Italy and Argentina, Saldanha was admitted into the Sant'Eugenio Hospital, in Rome, with respiratory problems, and died eight days later.

Honours 
Botafogo
 Campeonato Carioca: 1957

Legacy
Starting from 2004, the winners of the second turn of the Campeonato Brasileiro Série A, are awarded with the "Troféu João Saldanha", given by the Brazilian newspaper Lance!.

References

Further reading
João Maximo: João Saldanha: sobre nuvens de fantasia. Ediouro Publicações, 

1917 births
1990 deaths
Sportspeople from Rio Grande do Sul
Brazilian communists
Brazilian football managers
Botafogo de Futebol e Regatas managers
Brazil national football team managers